Gibraltar Hill may refer to:

One of five hills and mountains in Australia:
Gibraltar Hill (Bungendore, New South Wales)
Gibraltar Hill (Williamsdale, New South Wales)
Gibraltar Peak (Canberra), located within the Tidbinbilla Nature Reserve in the Australian Capital Territory
Gibralter Hill, located near Grahamstown, New South Wales 
Mount Gibraltar, located between Bowral and Mittagong, New South Wales
A peak located in Antarctica
Gibraltar Peak

See also 
Gibraltar